Thomas Young Duncan (1836 – 18 August 1914), sometimes referred to as "Tam Duncan", was a New Zealand politician of the Liberal Party.

Early life
Born at Plumbridge, County Tyrone, Ireland, in 1836, Duncan was educated at Castledamph National School. In 1858 he went to Victoria where he worked on the goldfields, and then in 1862 followed the gold rush to Central Otago in New Zealand. After little success, he began farming at Pukeuri, north of Oamaru, and lived there for the remainder of his life.

Political career

He represented the Waitaki electorate from 1881 to 1890 and then the Oamaru electorate from 1890 to 1911, when he was defeated by Ernest Lee. He was appointed to the New Zealand Legislative Council on 13 June 1912 and served until his death in 1914.

Notes

References

1836 births
1914 deaths
People from County Tyrone
Irish emigrants to colonial Australia
Irish emigrants to New Zealand (before 1923)
New Zealand Liberal Party MPs
New Zealand Liberal Party MLCs
Members of the New Zealand House of Representatives
New Zealand MPs for South Island electorates
Members of the New Zealand Legislative Council
Unsuccessful candidates in the 1911 New Zealand general election
19th-century New Zealand politicians